The 2008 Rugby League World Cup featured the national teams (selected from twenty-four-man squads) of ten nations: Australia, England, New Zealand, Papua New Guinea, Fiji, France, Scotland, Ireland, Samoa, and Tonga.

Pool A

Australia
Head coach: Ricky Stuart 
Assistant coaches: John Cartwright and Allan Langer

1 Replaced originally selected Brett Stewart and Justin Hodges who withdrew on 16 October.

2 Replaced originally selected Michael Crocker who withdrew due to injury on 9 October.

England
Head coach: Tony Smith /Assistant coach: Steve McNamara

New Zealand
Head coach: Stephen Kearney Assistant coach: Wayne Bennett 

1 Replaced originally named Iosia Soliola who withdrew due to injury on 21 October.

2 Replaced originally named Brent Webb and Jeff Lima who withdrew due to injury on 7 October.

Papua New Guinea
Head coach: Adrian Lam

Pool B

Fiji
Head coach: Joe Dakuitoga

France
Head coach: John Monie

Scotland
Except for Edinburgh Eagles stand-off Paddy Couper, all of the Scottish team's players were selected under the grandparent rule.

Head coach: Steve McCormack

Pool C

Ireland
Head coach: Andy Kelly 

Brett White was originally named but withdrew due to injury on 9 October. He was replaced by Brendan Guilfoyle.
Shannon McDonnell has also withdrawn due to injury. He was replaced by Shayne McMenemy.

Samoa
Head coach: John Ackland

Tonga
Head coach: Jim Dymock 

Fuifui Moimoi and Taniela Tuiaki were originally named for Tonga but were ruled ineligible by the Rugby League International Federation after both switched from Tonga to New Zealand in 2007. A New South Wales court later ruled that they could join the team after 12 November, making them available if Tonga made the Semi-finals.
Fraser and Louis Anderson both were originally named but withdrew due to injury. They were replaced by Kim Usai and Sam Moa.
Anthony Tupou was originally named but withdrew on 9 October after being called into the Australian squad.

Welcome to Country
As part of the official opening of the World Cup on 26 October, an exhibition game was played between an Aboriginal selection and a New Zealand Māori side.

Indigenous Dreamtime Team
Head coach: Neil Henry

New Zealand Māori
Head coach: Luke Goodwin

Notes and references

Positions

References

External links
"World Cup team guide" at The Guardian

Squads
Rugby League World Cup squads